Helen Simonson is an English author who lives in the United States.

Early life
Helen Simonson was born and raised in England. When she was a teenager, her family moved to East Sussex. She attended university in London, then moved to the United States, where she has lived for more than three decades and is a citizen. She is a resident of Brooklyn and has also lived in the Washington, D.C. area. Her first two books are set in rural East Sussex.

Bibliography

Film
Screen rights to Major Pettigrew's Last Stand were sold in 2011 to producers Paula Mazur, Mitchell Kaplan and Kevin McCormick. They hired Jack Thorne to write the screenplay.

References

External links
Helen Simonson on Facebook
Helen Simonson on Twitter
Official website

Year of birth missing (living people)
Living people
English women novelists
21st-century English novelists
21st-century English women writers